Sparrows Herne Turnpike Road  from London to Aylesbury was an 18th-century English toll road passing through Watford and Hemel Hempstead. The route was approximately that of the original A41 road; the Edgware Road, through Watford, Kings Langley, Apsley, the Boxmoor area of Hemel Hempstead, Berkhamsted, Northchurch, Cow Roast and Tring. Much of this part is now numbered the A4251 road. It linked in with other turnpikes to the north forming a route to Birmingham.

The turnpike trust was set up in 1762 by around 300 landed gentry to look after about 26 miles of road between Sparrows Herne near Bushey and Walton near Aylesbury. It was the turnpike's depot at Sparrows Herne which gave the road its name. 

The frequent use of the route by heavy carts carrying grain to London made it notorious for its rutted and pitted state even after being made into a turnpike.

The turnpike survived the coming of the railways until 1872, when it passed to the route's various parishes and highway boards to maintain and the tolls were removed.

Description
The original turnpike gates were: 
Watford Gate at the bottom of Chalk Hill.
Ridge Lane Gate on the north side of Watford.
New Ground Gate just to the south of Tring near New Ground Farm,
Veeches Farm Gate, west of Aston Clinton – this was moved to Aylesbury in 1827 after the road was extended.
The top of Tring Hill in 1860.

Brick toll houses for these gates were built at a cost of around £25 each. Tollkeepers were appointed and paid 10s/6d a week for which they had to man the gate day and night and from which money they had to pay for the oil for the nighttime illumination of the gates with lamps.

In 1762, the maximum rate for tolls were:
Horse or beast drawing a coach - 3d
Packhorse (laden) - 1½d
Drove of oxen, cows etc. - 10d per score
Drove of sheep, calves, swine - 5d per score.

References

Humphreys, A. L. 'Records of Turnpike Trusts : Sparrows Herne'. in Notes and Queries, 180 (1941), 211-13.
Littlefair, K.   The Life of the Sparrows Herne Turnpike Trust 1762–1873 (1968 Dissertation, University of Exeter)

External links
Transport At Watford History
Edgware At British Online History
The Chiltern Canal Corridor Castle Wharf project Berkhamsted. Accessed April 2007
Strip Map from London to Aylesbury, Bowles's Post Chaise Companion, 1782.

Turnpike roads in the United Kingdom
Transport in Hertfordshire
History of Hertfordshire
Dacorum